John Butte may refer to:

John Butte (MP for Gloucester) (fl. 1366), MP for Gloucester
John But (fl. 1402–1425), or Butte, MP for Bodmin, Barnstaple, Liskeard and Truro

See also
Big John Butte, mountain in Montana